Päivi Hiltunen-Toivio is a Finnish diplomat. She was Finnish Ambassador to Jakarta. She has been in charge from 15 August 2014 to 2018. She started with the Ministry for Foreign Affairs in 1979.

Hiltunen-Toivio worked before Jakarta to become Finland's ambassador in Prague, in the Czech Republic, where she started on September 1, 2010 and before that she has worked as the Consul General of Finland in Shanghai and various positions at the Finnish Embassy in Paris and at the Finnish EU Delegation in Brussels.

Hiltunen-Toivio has worked in Finland for several EU-related positions, such as Deputy Secretary of the EU Presidency Secretariat of the Ministry of Foreign Affairs, Head of Unit for EU Enlargement at the EU Department and Special Adviser to EU Affairs at the Prime Minister's Office. She also worked at the Ministry of Foreign Affairs' Political, Trade Policy, Legal and Protocol Department.

References

Year of birth missing (living people)
Living people
Ambassadors of Finland to Indonesia
Ambassadors of Finland to the Czech Republic
Finnish women ambassadors